Xavier Bosch i Sancho, publicly known as Xavier Bosch (Barcelona, July 21, 1967) is a catalan-spanish writer and journalist.

He was the creator, together with Antoni Bassas of the humorous program Alguna pregunta més? at Catalunya Ràdio, for which he received an Ondas award. Specializing in sports journalism, he worked at La Vanguardia, TV3, RAC 1 and was director of the newspaper Avui from 2007 to 2008. In 2010 he has been one of the initiator of a new daily newspaper in Catalan language, Diari Ara. Regarding his career as a novelist, he has written a trilogy starred by journalist Dani Santana, which first book Se sabrà tot received a Sant Jordi Award in 2009. Second and third novels were Homes d'honor (2012) and Eufòria. His novel Algú com tu (Someone like you) (2015), is winner of the 2015 Ramon Llull Award. On his last novel La dona de la seva vida he writes about child abduction.

Works

Short stories 
 Jo, el simolses, Barcelona: La Magrana, 1992.
 Estimat diari (with Lloll Bertran, Antoni Bassas), Barcelona: La Magrana, 1996.
 Vicis domèstics, Barcelona: La Magrana, 1998.

Novel 
 La màgia dels reis, Barcelona: Columna - La Galera, 1994.
 Se sabrà tot, 2009.
 Homes d'honor, Barcelona: Proa, 2012.
 Eufòria, 2014.
 Algú com tu, 2014
Nosaltres dos, 2017
Paraules que tu entendràs, 2019
La dona de la seva vida, 2021.

Teatre 
 El culékulé, Barcelona: La Magrana, 1996

Prizes 
 Premi Ondas 1997 for the humour program Alguna pregunta més? 
 Premi Mundo Deportivo de periodisme 1999, for the program Aquest any, cent!. 
 Premio Premi APEI-Catalunya (in its sixth edition) for El món a RAC 1. 
 Premi Ràdio Associació de Catalunya 2007 in the category of the Best Radio Program for El món a RAC 1.
 Premi Sant Jordi for the novel Se sabrà tot.
 Premi Ramon Llull 2015 for the novel Algú com tu.

References 

Journalists from Catalonia
Novelists from Catalonia
Writers from Barcelona
1967 births
Living people